Meteorus is a genus of parasitoid wasps in the family Braconidae. It comprises over 330 species worldwide.

Meteorus wasps are distinguished from other braconid wasps by the presence of a second submarginal cell in the forewing and a petiolate first tergite.

Selected species
Meteorus andreae Aguirrer & Shaw, 2011
Meteorus gyrator Thunberg, 1922
Meteorus laphygmae Viereck 1913
Meteorus pulchricornis Wesmael, 1835
Meteorus rubens Nees, 1811
Meteorus stellatus Fujie et al., 2021
Meteorus trachynotus Viereck, 1912

References

Braconidae